Moinuddin Ahmed is an All India United Democratic Front politician from Assam. He was elected in Assam Legislative Assembly election in 2011 from Jaleswar constituency.

References 

Living people
All India United Democratic Front politicians
People from Dhubri district
Assam MLAs 2011–2016
Year of birth missing (living people)